Events from the year 1606 in Denmark.

Incumbents 
 Monarch – Christian IV

Events
 20 March  Sorø Pharmacy is established in Sorø.

Undated
 The first part of Rosenborg Castle is constructed.
 Christian IV's 2nd Greenland Expedition is sent to Greenland under the command of Godske Lindenov.
 Christian IV embarks on a comprehensive upgrade of Copenhagen's fortifications which will last 20 years.
 The main building of Trods Katholm is constructed.

Births
 27 March  Hans Svane, statesman (died 1668)
 10 July Corfitz Ulfeldt, s statesman, and one of the most notorious traitors in Danish history (died 1664)

Full date missing
 Karen Sehested, court official and landowner (died 1672)

Deaths

References 

 
Denmark
Years of the 17th century in Denmark